Sergei Gornyakov (Russian: Сергей Васильевич Горняков; born 5 January 1966) is a Russian politician serving as a senator from the Legislative Assembly of Volgograd Oblast since 9 October 2019.

Sergei Gornyakov is under personal sanctions introduced by the European Union, the United Kingdom, the USA, Canada, Switzerland, Australia, Ukraine, New Zealand, for ratifying the decisions of the "Treaty of Friendship, Cooperation and Mutual Assistance between the Russian Federation and the Donetsk People's Republic and between the Russian Federation and the Luhansk People's Republic" and providing political and economic support for Russia's annexation of Ukrainian territories.

Biography

Sergei Gornyakov was born on 5 January 1966 in Volgograd, Volgograd Oblast. In 2001, she graduated from Volgograd State University. Afterwards, he worked as gas electric welder and as senior inspector of the road patrol service of the Department of Internal Affairs of the Uryupinsk region. Gornyakov was also engaged in private entrepreneurship. From 2005 to 2014, he was the head of Uryupinsk State Duma. On 28 September 2019, he became the senator from the Legislative Assembly of Volgograd Oblast.

References

Living people
1966 births
United Russia politicians
21st-century Russian politicians
People from Volgograd
Members of the Federation Council of Russia (after 2000)